Joseph Gérard Daniel Poulin (September 19, 1957 – January 2, 2015) was a Canadian professional ice hockey player who played three games in the National Hockey League (NHL) for the Minnesota North Stars during the 1981–82 season The rest of his career, which lasted from 1977 to 1990, was spent in the minor leagues and then in the Swiss Nationalliga A. After his playing career Poulin worked as a coach in Switzerland for several years, primarily with HC Moutier.

As a youth, he played in the 1970 Quebec International Pee-Wee Hockey Tournament with a minor ice hockey team from Thetford Mines. He died of skin cancer in 2015.

Career statistics

Regular season and playoffs

References

External links

1957 births
2015 deaths
Canadian expatriate ice hockey players in Switzerland
Canadian ice hockey coaches
Canadian ice hockey defencemen
Chicoutimi Saguenéens (QMJHL) players
EHC Biel players
Erie Blades players
HC Davos players
Ice hockey people from Quebec
Kalamazoo Wings (1974–2000) players
Kenora Muskies players
Minnesota North Stars players
Montreal Canadiens draft picks
Muskegon Mohawks players
Nashville South Stars players
Oklahoma City Stars players
Sportspeople from Thetford Mines